The iPhone has a wide variety of accessories made by Apple available for it.

EarPods

Apple EarPods (introduced on September 12, 2012) first shipped with the iPhone 5 and feature a remote control and microphone. They also ship with the fifth-generation iPod touch (without mic) and the seventh-generation iPod nano (without mic). They're also sold independently. The Apple EarPods are assembled in Vietnam.

All but the basic earbuds have control capsules allowing users to adjust volume and control music and video playback, located on the cable of the right earpiece; those "with Remote and Mic" also include a microphone for phone calls and voice control of certain devices. Users can adjust volume, control music and video playback (play/pause and next/previous,) and record voice memos on supported iPod and iPhone models and Mac computers. There have been many reports of moisture problems with the remote/mic earbuds. The original iPhone and iPhone 3G came with the iPhone Stereo Headset, a push-button and microphone on the right side of the headphones (there is no volume control, and only limited control of calls).

Dock
A series of docks released for the iPhone 5, 5s, and 5c, were announced and released on September 10, 2013. The docks have an identical design, with an audio-out and Lightning-in port on the back, and a Lightning connector on the top. One dock was released solely for the iPhone 5 and 5s, with another dock optimized for the iPhone 5c. The dock is not compatible with iPhones in their cases.

Case
For the physical care of the cell phone it is advisable to use cases that cover the entire back of the cell phone. Currently there are many distributors that offer different alternatives in models, materials, colors and custom designs.

References

 
IPhone